The 2020–21 Tulane Green Wave women's basketball team will represent Tulane University during the 2020–21 NCAA Division I women's basketball season. The Green Wave, led by twenty-seventh year head coach Lisa Stockton, play their home games at Devlin Fieldhouse and are seventh year members of the American Athletic Conference.

Media
All Green Wave games will be broadcast on WRBH 88.3 FM. A video stream for all home games will be on Tulane All-Access, ESPN3, or AAC Digital. Road games will typically be streamed on the opponents website, though conference road games could also appear on ESPN3 or AAC Digital.

Roster

Schedule and results

|-
!colspan=9 style=| Regular season

|-
!colspan=9 style=| AAC Women's Tournament

|-
!colspan=9 style=| WNIT

Rankings

See also
 2020–21 Tulane Green Wave men's basketball team

References

Tulane
Tulane Green Wave women's basketball seasons
Tulane
Tulane
Tulane